The 2008 Mohammed bin Rashid International Football Championship, also known as the 2008 Dubai Cup, is a friendly football tournament that took place in Dubai, United Arab Emirates. The 2008 edition took place from 5 till 7 January 2008.

Participant teams

Bracket

First round

Third place play-off

Final

Champion

See also
Dubai Football Challenge

External links
 Competition official website

Mohammed bin Rashid International Football Championship
Mo
2007–08 in German football
2007–08 in Dutch football
2008 in Brazilian football